Francesco Domenico Guerrazzi (12 August 1804 – 25 September 1873) was an Italian writer and politician involved in the Italian Risorgimento.

Biography
Guerrazzi was born in the seaport of Livorno, then part of the Grand Duchy of Tuscany. He studied law at the university of Pisa, graduating in 1824. He began to practice in Livorno, but soon gave up law in favour of politics and literature, being particularly influenced by Byron, to whom he dedicated his "Stanze" (1825).  His first novel, La Battaglia di Benevento was published in 1827.

Giuseppe Mazzini made his acquaintance, and in 1829, together with Carlo Bini, they started a newspaper, L'Indicatore Livornese, at Livorno.

  The authorities of the Grand Duchy of Tuscany suppressed the periodical in February 1830 after 48 issues.

In the same year Guerrazzi was banished to Montepulciano for six months after writing an oration to the memory of Cosimo Del Fante — a native of Livorno who had embraced the ideals of the French Revolution and whom Guerrazzi held up as an example for the idealists of the risorgimento. While confined to Montepulciano he began work on his most famous novel, L'Assedio di Firenze - based on and greatly glorifying the life of the 16th Century Florentine soldier Francesco Ferruccio.

Guerrazzi was to be imprisoned several times for his activity in the cause of "Young Italy"; in 1833 he was locked up for three months in the Forte Stella at Portoferraio.

Subsequently, he became the most powerful Liberal leader at Livorno. In 1848 Guerrazzi was appointed a minister, with some idea of mediating between the reformers and the grand duke of Tuscany, Leopold II. On 8 February 1849, following Leopold's flight, Guerrazzi formed a governing triumvirate with Giuseppe Mazzoni and Giuseppe Montanelli and a republic was proclaimed; on 27 March Guerrazzi was nominated dictator.

On Leopold's restoration, Guerrazzi refused to flee and he was sentenced to 15 years of imprisonment. In these years he worked on his Apologia, which was published in 1852. After three years in prison his sentence was commuted to exile in Corsica; in 1857 he escaped from the island and lived for some time in Genoa. From 1862 to 1870, he served as a deputy in the Italian parliament at Turin.

Guerrazzi died of a stroke in Cecina some 30 km from his birthplace, Livorno.

His other major works include Isabella Orsini (1845) and Beatrice Cenci (1854). Moreover, two historic novels placed in Corsica during the 18th century: La torre di Nonza (1857) and Pasquale Paoli ossia la Rotta di Pontenuovo. Racconto Corso del Secolo XVIII (1860). His collected Opere appeared in 1868.

When in 1854 Beatrice Cenci was lambasted by Francesco de Sanctis (who now favored the House of Savoy leadership for Italy), he wrote to a friend: "Honoured Alessandro Manzoni, I am put down... to think that as far back as '40 Britons and Germans saw us as leaders of two different schools, and his they labelled sleep-inducing".

Notes

References

External links 

 
 

1804 births
1873 deaths
People from Livorno
Italian politicians
Italian people of the Italian unification
People of the Revolutions of 1848
19th-century Italian novelists
19th-century male writers